Magda Linette and Katarzyna Piter were the defending champions, having won the event in 2012, but Piter chose not to participate in 2013. Linette partnered up with Naomi Broady, but lost to Yuliya Beygelzimer and Çağla Büyükakçay in the semifinals.

Beygelzimer and Büyükakçay won the tournament, defeating Eleni Daniilidou and Aleksandra Krunić in the final, 6–3, 6–3.

Seeds

Draw

References 
 Draw

Ankara Cup - Doubles
Ankara Cup